Michelle Terry is an Olivier Award–winning English actress and writer, known for her extensive work for Shakespeare's Globe, the Royal Shakespeare Company and the Royal National Theatre, as well as her television work, notably writing and starring in the Sky One television series The Café. Terry took up the role of artistic director at Shakespeare's Globe in April 2018.

Early life
Terry was born in Nuneaton, moving whilst still a child to grow up in Weston-super-Mare. She was raised in Kewstoke, and attended Priory Community School and Broadoak Sixth Form Centre.

Terry aspired to be an actress from an early age. She attended an amateur dramatic society and took LAMDA exams at school in poetry, prose and spoken verse. At the age of fourteen she joined the National Youth Theatre. She read English literature at Cardiff University before training at the Royal Academy of Dramatic Art, graduating in 2004.

Career

Theatre
Terry made her professional debut in the touring and subsequent West End production of Blithe Spirit, playing the Maid and understudying Elvira. Her other theatre credits include The War on Terror, 50 Ways to Leave Your Lover, The Man Who Had All the Luck, Tribes and As You Like It. Her work at the National Theatre includes London Assurance, All's Well That Ends Well and England People Very Nice. She also appeared in broadcast versions of London Assurance and All's Well That Ends Well as part of National Theatre Live. For the Royal Shakespeare Company, Terry has appeared in productions of Days of Significance, Pericles, The Winter's Tale, The Crucible and Love's Labour's Lost, playing Rosaline. She was among the writers of Sudden Loss of Dignity, staged at the Bush Theatre in 2009.

Terry won critical acclaim for her work at Shakespeare's Globe Theatre, for her performance of Rosalind in As You Like It.  London's Financial Times wrote "I'm not sure it's possible to see Michelle Terry on a stage without falling a little in love with her. She has the intelligence, inventiveness and vivacity to play the character and the show simultaneously, not setting herself above the material but relishing her immersion in the role and inviting us to share it with her." She also appeared in productions of Love's Labour's Lost and A Midsummer Night's Dream at that venue, both of which were released on DVD. On 24 July 2017 she was announced as its fourth Artistic Director, to succeed Emma Rice in April 2018.

Hamlet 2018
Terry starred in the lead role in a 2018 gender fluid version of Hamlet.  The Spectator said in their review "No one but Ms Terry would have hired Ms Terry for this role. She’s a decent second-tier actress without any special vocal or physical endowments."

The Guardian called the play "A perfectly decent production and a welcome relief from the work of the previous Globe regime, which seemed to assume that the plays were a bit boring unless jazzed up."

The Stage said "It's a production that places clarity of verse and emotion over directorial fireworks. One of the most striking elements is Terry's costume. When she assumes her antic disposition, she also dons a white clown suit with a jagged lipstick grin. By making Hamlet a jester, it licenses her to behave in different ways. It shifts her status in the family. It grants her power and marks her apart. Laughter can be a weapon after all. It's an interesting idea that is under-explored."

Macbeth 2018 
Terry starred in the lead role of Lady Macbeth opposite her husband Paul Ready in Macbeth at the Globe's candlelit Sam Wanamaker Playhouse.

Television
Her television credits include episodes of Extras, Law & Order: UK and the Mike Bullen pilot Reunited, playing "Sara". She was co-writer, with Ralf Little, of the comedy drama TV series, The Café, which aired on Sky1 from 2011–13, in which she played "Sarah Porter". The series was set and filmed in her own hometown, Weston-super-Mare.

Personal life
Terry is married to the actor Paul Ready. They have one daughter.

Theatre credits
 Blithe Spirit Savoy Theatre: London (2005)
 As You Like It New Vic Theatre: Newcastle-under-Lyme (2005)
 The Crucible Royal Shakespeare Theatre: Stratford Upon Avon (2006)
 Pericles Swan Theatre: Stratford Upon Avon (2006/7)
 The Winter's Tale Swan Theatre: Stratford Upon Avon (2006/07)
 Love's Labour's Lost Shakespeare's Globe Theatre: London (2007)
 The War on Terror Bush Theatre: London (2008)
 50 Ways to Leave Your Lover Bush Theatre: London (2008)
 The Man Who Had All the Luck Donmar Warehouse: London (2008)
 Tribes Royal Court Theatre London (2010)
 England People Very Nice National Theatre: London (2009)
 All's Well That Ends Well National Theatre: London (2009)
 London Assurance National Theatre: London (2010)
 Light Shining in Buckinghamshire Arcola Theatre: London (2010)
 The Comedy of Errors National Theatre: London (2011/12)
 In The Republic of Happiness Royal Court Theatre: London (2012/13)
 Before the Party Almeida Theatre: London (2013) 
 A Midsummer Night's Dream Shakespeare's Globe Theatre: London (2013)
 Love's Labour's Lost and Much Ado About Nothing (Love's Labour's Won) Royal Shakespeare Theatre: Stratford Upon Avon (2014)
 Privacy Donmar Warehouse (2014)
 As You Like It Shakespeare's Globe: London (2015)
 Cleansed National Theatre: London (2016) 
 Henry V Regents Park Theatre: London (2016)
 Hamlet Shakespeare's Globe: London (2018)
Macbeth Shakespeare's Globe: London (2019)
Henry IV, Part 1 Shakespeare's Globe: London (2019)

Filmography

Television

Awards
Terry won Best Actress in a Visiting Production at the 2008 Manchester Evening News Theatre Awards, for the Donmar Warehouse production of The Man Who Had All the Luck.

She won Best Actress in a Supporting Role at the 2011 Olivier Awards, for her portrayal of Sylvia in the Royal Court Theatre production of Tribes.

References

External links

Living people
People from Weston-super-Mare
Alumni of Cardiff University
Alumni of RADA
English stage actresses
English television actresses
English Shakespearean actresses
Laurence Olivier Award winners
National Youth Theatre members
1979 births